SWK may refer to:

 Samakkhi Witthayakhom School, a high school in the northern Thailand
 Scott Wilson Group's London Stock Exchange ticker symbol
 London Borough of Southwark's ISO geocode
Stacy & Witbeck, Inc. and Kiewit Western, Co., A Joint Venture, a light rail construction company
 Stanley Black & Decker's New York Stock Exchange stock ticker symbol
 Star Wars Kid, an Internet phenomenon
 SWK MOBIL, a German transport operator
 SWK Technology, a premier Sage Reseller of Sage MAS 90, Sage MAS 200, Sage MAS 500, Sage X3 ERP, and SageCRM software 
 Sealed With a Kiss
 Southwick railway station, a railway station in Sussex, England (station code: SWK)